9th StLFCA Awards
December 17, 2012

Best Film: 
Argo

Best Director: 
Ben Affleck
Argo

The nominees for the 9th St. Louis Film Critics Association Awards were announced on December 11, 2012. The winners were announced on December 17, 2012.

Winners, runners-up and nominees

Best Actor
 Daniel Day-Lewis – Lincoln
 Runner-up: John Hawkes – The Sessions
 Bradley Cooper – Silver Linings Playbook
 Jamie Foxx – Django Unchained
 Joaquin Phoenix – The Master
 Denzel Washington – Flight

Best Actress
 Jessica Chastain – Zero Dark Thirty
 Runner-up: Jennifer Lawrence – Silver Linings Playbook
 Helen Mirren – Hitchcock
 Aubrey Plaza – Safety Not Guaranteed
 Quvenzhané Wallis – Beasts of the Southern Wild

Best Adapted Screenplay
 Lincoln – Tony Kushner (TIE) Silver Linings Playbook – David O. Russell (TIE) Argo – Chris Terrio
 Beasts of the Southern Wild – Lucy Alibar and Benh Zeitlin
 Life of Pi – David Magee
 The Perks of Being a Wallflower – Stephen Chbosky

Best Animated Film
 Wreck-It Ralph
 Runner-up: ParaNorman
 Brave
 Frankenweenie
 Rise of the Guardians

Best Cinematography
 Skyfall – Roger Deakins Runner-up: Life of Pi – Claudio Miranda
 Beasts of the Southern Wild – Ben Richardson
 Cloud Atlas – Frank Griebe and John Toll
 Django Unchained – Robert Richardson
 The Master – Mihai Mălaimare Jr.

Best Comedy Film
 Moonrise Kingdom (TIE) Ted (TIE) The Cabin in the Woods
 Seven Psychopaths
 Wreck-It Ralph

Best Director
 Ben Affleck – Argo
 Runner-up: Quentin Tarantino – Django Unchained (TIE)
 Runner-up: Benh Zeitlin – Beasts of the Southern Wild (TIE)
 Wes Anderson – Moonrise Kingdom
 Kathryn Bigelow – Zero Dark Thirty
 Ang Lee – Life of Pi

Best Documentary Film
 Searching for Sugar Man
 Runner-up: Ai Weiwei: Never Sorry (TIE)
 Runner-up: Bully (TIE)
 Runner-up: How to Survive a Plague (TIE)
 Jiro Dreams of Sushi

Best Film
 Argo
 Runner-up: Life of Pi (TIE)
 Runner-up: Lincoln (TIE)
 Django Unchained
 Moonrise Kingdom
 Zero Dark Thirty

Best Foreign Language Film
 The Intouchables (Intouchables) • France Runner-up: The Fairy (La fée) • Belgium / France (TIE)
 Runner-up: Headhunters (Hodejegerne) • Norway (TIE)
 Holy Motors • France / Germany
 The Kid with a Bike (Le gamin au vélo) • Belgium / France / Italy

Best Music
 Django Unchained (TIE) Moonrise Kingdom (TIE) Beasts of the Southern Wild
 Cloud Atlas
 The Dark Knight Rises
 Not Fade Away

Best Original Screenplay
 Zero Dark Thirty – Mark Boal Runner-up: Django Unchained – Quentin Tarantino
 The Cabin in the Woods – Joss Whedon and Drew Goddard
 Moonrise Kingdom – Wes Anderson and Roman Coppola
 Seven Psychopaths – Martin McDonagh

Best Supporting Actor
 Christoph Waltz – Django Unchained
 Runner-up: Tommy Lee Jones – Lincoln
 Alan Arkin – Argo
 John Goodman – Argo
 William H. Macy – The Sessions
 Bruce Willis – Moonrise Kingdom

Best Supporting Actress
 Ann Dowd – Compliance (TIE)
 Helen Hunt – The Sessions (TIE)
 Amy Adams – The Master
 Sally Field – Lincoln
 Anne Hathaway – Les Misérables
 Emma Watson – The Perks of Being a Wallflower

Best Visual Effects
 Bill Westenhofer – Life of Pi
 Runner-up: The Avengers
 Cloud Atlas
 Prometheus
 Snow White and the Huntsman

Best Arthouse or Festival Film
 Compliance (TIE)
 Safety Not Guaranteed (TIE)
 Bernie
 The Fairy (La fée)
 Sleepwalk with Me
 Take This Waltz

Best Scene
 Django Unchained: The "bag head" bag/mask problems scene (TIE)
 Hitchcock: Anthony Hopkins in lobby conducting to music/audience's reaction during Psycho shower scene (TIE)
 The Impossible: Opening tsunami scene (TIE)
 The Master: The first "processing" questioning scene between Philip Seymour Hoffman and Joaquin Phoenix (TIE)
 Beasts of the Southern Wild: The hurricane (and Wink shooting at it)
 Flight: The plane crash

References

External links
 Official website

2012 film awards
2012 in Missouri
St Louis
2012